The Billboard magazine publishes a weekly chart that ranks the best-selling albums in the United States. The chart nowadays known as the Billboard 200 was titled Best-Selling Popular Record Albums in 1948 and was based on a "weekly survey among 4,970 dealers In all sections of the country. During the year, eleven albums by fifteen artists topped the chart.

Like in the previous years, Merry Christmas by Bing Crosby was the first album to top the chart in the year. It started its run in the issue dated November 15, 1947 and stayed atop for the first week in January. In the issue dated November 15, 1948, the album again ascended to number one for an additional six weeks, for a total of seven weeks at number one in 1948 and a total of 27 weeks since December 1945.

Chart history

See also
1948 in music
List of number-one albums (United States)

Footnotes

References

1948
United States albums
1948 in American music